Gajanana and Gang is a 2022 Indian Kannada-language romantic drama film directed by Abhishek Shetty and starring Shri Mahadev and Aditi Prabhudeva. The music was composed by Praddyottan.

Cast 
Shri Mahadev as Gajendra (Gaja) 
Aditi Prabhudeva as Sahithya
Chethan Durga as Mounesh
Abhishek Shetty as Vishnu

Release
The film was released on 3 June 2022. It was initially set for release on 4 February 2022 but was later it was postponed due to the COVID-19 pandemic.

References

External links 
 

Indian romantic drama films
2020s Kannada-language films
2022 films
2022 romantic drama films
Films shot in Karnataka